Gustaf Norlin (born 9 January 1997) is a Swedish football midfielder who plays for IFK Göteborg.

Career
Norlin made his Allsvenskan debut on the 15 June 2020 in a 3–0 win over Helsingborgs IF, scoring the third and final goal in the 62nd minute.

References

External links
 

1997 births
Living people
Swedish footballers
Association football midfielders
Skövde AIK players
Varbergs BoIS players
IFK Göteborg players
Ettan Fotboll players
Allsvenskan players
People from Lidköping Municipality
Sportspeople from Västra Götaland County